Gallieniella is a genus of East African araneomorph spiders in the family Gallieniellidae, and was first described by J. Millot in 1947. Originally placed with the sac spiders, it was moved to the Gallieniellidae in 1967.

Species
 it contains four species:
Gallieniella betroka Platnick, 1984 – Madagascar
Gallieniella blanci Platnick, 1984 – Madagascar
Gallieniella jocquei Platnick, 1984 – Comoros
Gallieniella mygaloides Millot, 1947 (type) – Madagascar

References

Araneomorphae genera
Gallieniellidae
Spiders of Africa